There are no diplomatic relations that exist between Israel and Yemen and relations between the two countries are very tense. Yemen refuses the admission of people with an Israeli passport or any passport with an Israeli stamp, and the country is defined as an "enemy state" by Israeli law.

History
Yemen occupies a strategic position at the entrance to the Red Sea and its control of the Bab-el-Mandeb, Israel's outlet to the Indian Ocean and the Far East, which increased its importance in the eyes of Israeli strategists. Yemenite Jews once formed a sizable Jewish minority in Yemen, with a distinct culture from the world’s other Jewish communities. Most emigrated to Israel in the mid-20th century.

In February 1948, Imam Yahya was assassinated and his successor, Imam Ahmad bin Yahya, came to power. The new Imam called upon all Arabs to unite against the Zionist State. He made promises to provide Egypt assistance in the war against Israel, but his contributions were minor. After learning of the Arab defeat, and establishment of the State of Israel, the new Imam feared that Israel might demand reparations for property left by Jews who had immigrated to Israel. Thinking this, he swiftly set into motion a plan for Jewish emigration en masse; referred to as "Operation Magic Carpet", the effort would see nearly 50,000 Jews flying safely out of Yemen. 
 
When the country was divided after Britain's withdrawal in 1967, both North and South Yemen adopted a policy that was in line with their superpower orientation. Thus, Marxist South Yemen began to regard the Arab–Israeli conflict through Soviet eyes, depicting Israel as a tool manipulated by United States capitalism, while the Yemen Arab Republic in the north tended to side with the moderate Arab countries whose hostility towards Israel was milder in comparison. This pragmatic approach became even more pronounced following the merger of the two countries on May 22, 1990. Yemen's attitude during the Gulf War was clearly a byproduct of pragmatic thought. While the newly united Yemeni State did not join the Western coalition, it refrained from sending forces to Saddam Hussein's aid, and at the same time portrayed itself as a mediator and an honest broker in the conflict. San'a's attitude toward Israel showed similar tendencies. The end of the Cold War and the demise of the Soviet Union led to reassessment in San'a, which resulted in improved relations with the US and reduced hostility towards Israel.

Civil war years
In the spring of 1958, barely a month after forming a union with Syria, Egyptian President Gamal Abdel Nasser established a new union between the United Arab Republic and Yemen. As a gesture of goodwill and solidarity with the UAR, the Ba'ath Party was allowed to establish a branch in San'a. Both Egypt and Syria supported the republican forces in Yemen, and thereby encouraged Sallal's regime to take a similar regional stance regarding the occupation of Palestine. Sallal's visit to Damascus in early summer of 1963 was widely publicized in the Arab press as a sign of unity and a revival of all progressive, anti-imperialist forces. In 1964 Yemen joined twelve Arab states at a summit in Cairo, whose purpose was to plan reprisals against Israel for its diversion of the Jordan River. During the civil war between Royalists and Republicans in Yemen, Egypt supported the Republicans while Israel, Iran, and Saudi Arabia supported the Royalists with war material and training.

When an Egyptian pilot, Captain Abbas Hilmi defected to Israel in 1964, his interrogators learned that the Egyptians were using poison gas against the Yemeni Royalists. Israel persuaded Hilmi to condemn Sallal and the Egyptian involvement against the Royalists. However, Israel's efforts to find favor in the eyes of the Yemeni Royalists achieved limited results. In an effort to relieve itself from the Egyptian military force, the Royalist government appealed to the UAR to send its forces to fight against Israel instead, pledging that it would not attack the Republicans when they had gone.

In an attempt to explore the underlying reasons for the Six-Day War, observers concluded that both the U.S. and Great Britain sought the withdrawal of Egyptian forces from Yemen and that the war's objective was to restore the Royalist regime. Many Yemenis were convinced that Israel was behind this maneuver. Rumors spread in South Yemen that shortly before their withdrawal from there, the British collaborated with Israel in an attempt to crush the tribes of Southern Arabia in order to prolong their colonial rule.

Following the Six-Day War, Yemen severed its diplomatic relations with the US due to "Washington's blind support to Israel against the Arab cause in Palestine" and  condemned Israel for its occupation of Palestinian land. The division of Yemen into two countries following Britain's withdrawal was a source of major concern for the Israelis. A Yemeni government official assured the Americans that "North Yemen would do nothing to undermine U.S. peace efforts in the current Egyptian–Israeli talks to implement the Camp David agreements." In the early fall of 1987, relatively little attention was paid to the Arab-Israeli conflict due to the fact that the threat from Iran became the Arab world's primary occupation, and the YAR was just as concerned about the Iranian threat as its neighbors in South Arabia.

In 1976, the Israeli Defense Force (IDF) raided Entebbe Airport in Uganda and the Osiraq nuclear reactor in Iraq. This made officials in San'a aware that Israel would use force to keep its gateway to the Indian Ocean open. San'a's fears increased particularly since the Israeli Intelligence Services had frequently sent vessels to monitor any activity in the Red Sea. In addition, Israeli agents operated in the area to guarantee the safe passage of Israeli ships on their way to and from Eilat. San'a repeatedly called for an end to the Iran–Iraq War. In 1982 San'a not only condemned Israel for its invasion of Lebanon and the U.S. for facilitating that invasion, but also joined a ministerial delegation sent by South Yemen to all Arab capitals to discuss the issue. In addition, it joined South Yemen in informing PLO leader Yasser Arafat of its willingness to absorb Palestinian refugees.

North and South Yemen
On June 22, 1969, a coup overthrew Qahtan Muhammad al-Shaabi and brought Salim Rubai Ali to the Presidency. The new government began providing support in Lebanon. Israeli Intelligence Service's documents reveal that it had a detailed knowledge of the magnitude of South Yemen's assistance to the Palestinians. While Aden preached unity within the PLO camp, it maintained close contacts with the Popular Front for the Liberation of Palestine (PFLP).

The foreign policy resolutions of the Unification Congress of October 1975 called for support for the Palestinians. Reacting to Israel's raids in south Lebanon, Abd al-Fattah Ismail, a spokesman for South Yemen, attested to the close link with the Arab liberation movement in its entirety. In February 1977, Yasser Arafat was cordially received in Aden where he was referred to as "Brother Arafat the President of Palestine," and In March 1977, President Rubiyya Ali met the Somali, Sudanese and YAR chiefs of state in Taiz, in order to consider means of consolidating Arab solidarity "in order to confront Israel's aggressive policy and the Zionist forces supporting it". Responding to accusations made by Washington that South Yemen supported terrorism, Foreign Ministry officials in Aden claimed that supporting the just cause of national liberation movements, suppressed by Zionist imperialist and racist regimes did not constitute an act of terrorism.

In October 1978, South Yemen's main opposition party, the Yemeni Socialist Party (YSP) demanded that Israel withdraw from all Arab occupied territories and allow the establishment of a Palestinian state. But while it did not acknowledge Israel right to exist, the YSP did not call for its liquidation, nor did it call for the establishment of a "secular and democratic" state as the PLO Charter demanded. Israel was mentioned as being the political incarnation of Zionism. When Ali Nasir Muhammad came to power as President in October 1980, South Yemen joined Syria, Libya, Algeria, Iraq and the PLO in boycotting Sadat's peace initiative.

Following the seizure of the Achille Lauro passenger ship by the Palestinians in October 1987, Ali Nasir feared an Israeli strike, and therefore denied that PLO forces were stationed on an island controlled by South Yemen. When South Yemen embarked on an initiative to normalize relations with Oman in the late 1980s, the official statement from Aden was: 

Yet after the 1973 blockade, Yemen did not interrupt the free navigation of Israeli ships originating from Eilat, and when Soviet Premier Alexei Kosygin visited Aden in September 1979, South Yemen was prepared to accept the principle of freedom of navigation for all ships from "all adjoining states". At the same time, officials in Aden continued to express solidarity of their Arab neighbors. Therefore, in 1976 South Yemen sent troops as part of the Arab deterrent force in Lebanon, and when Ali Nasser Muhammad visited Moscow in February 1978, the joint communique issued by the two governments condemned the Israeli-Egyptian dialogue.

In 1982, South Yemen went along with the North Yemen's proposal to host PLO forces after their eviction from Lebanon by the Israelis. In 1983, it played a major diplomatic role in restoring unity within the Palestinian camp.

After reunification
The unification of the two Yemens on May 22, 1990, reduced the vocal campaign against Israel but did not bring normalization. During the Gulf crisis, Jordan's King Hussein persuaded Yemen to support Saddam Hussein, and there were reports of Yemeni troops concentration along the Saudi border. Then, in an about-face, the Government of Yemen invited General Norman Schwarzkopf to visit San'a. Confused by this policy turnabout, Israeli and Western observers regarded the invitation as a maneuver aimed at dividing the coalition. In the end, only Yemen and the PLO supported the Iraqi cause. However, the Yemeni government offered no more than vocal support. Yemen's sympathy for Saddam Hussein stemmed not only from its hostility towards Israel, but also from fear of the Saudi threat.

Covert negotiations regarding the transfer of Jews to Israel were denied by San'a. In an interview to Radio Amman, Yemen's Deputy Information Minister Abd-al-Rahman al-Akwa denied reports from Israeli and American sources that attempts were being made to transfer Yemeni Jews to Israel. When the London Sunday Times reported that Israel was preparing to airlift Yemeni Jews to Israel, Yemeni sources denied that San'a decided to expel the Jews and added that "Yemeni citizens, including Jews have the right to travel to any country except Israel. Ariel Sharon, who later became Israel's Minister of Housing was reported to have said that 1,600 Yemeni Jews were about to emigrate to Israel, and Integration Minister Rabbi Yitzhak Perez stated that Israel was using "secret efforts to bring 1,500 Jews from Yemen." In May 1992, Radio Monte Carlo in Arabic announced that a "responsible" Yemeni source has denied the veracity of the report about the immigration of Jews. In the spring of 1993, Israeli sources said that some 100 Jews immigrated secretly to Israel. Attempting to cover up the immigration issue, Yemeni sources said that prominent Jews had asked for protection against Israeli attempts to coerce them to immigrate to Israel.

In the autumn of 1993, Saleh met Mousa Mohammed Abu Marzook, head of the Hamas Political Bureau. The President of Yemen expressed full support for the Palestinian struggle, and they discussed ways to bring all Palestinian factions to agree on a common strategy. In an interview with an Egyptian weekly, Saleh said that his country would be willing to host a meeting of all Palestinian factions, in order to discuss their differences and bring unity to their ranks. In another interview with a London-based Arabic newspaper, Basindwah said that Yemen would exert every effort in order to reconcile all factions within the Palestinian camp and called on the Palestinians to prevent Israel from benefiting from the dissension in their ranks. When interviewed by the Egyptian press, Basindwah said that his government would support any decision made by the Palestinians. And when asked about the future of the Palestinian forces stationed in Yemen, he said that: "The Palestinian forces stationed in Yemen are actually in their homeland. But whether they decide to stay or leave is a matter for the PLO to decide."

When asked by a London weekly whether or not Arafat had informed him regarding the autonomy agreement with Israel, Saleh admitted that the agreement was reached in complete secrecy, and that he knew about it just a few weeks before its signature. He added:   When a journalist asked him about his country's position on the Israeli-Palestinian agreement regarding Gaza and Jericho, Saleh said: "We support the will of the Palestinian Arab people and whatever these militant Arab people have made and accepted. We had hoped for better agreement. We would have hoped that the Gaza-Jericho First Agreement would have also included the West Bank and East Jerusalem."

Despite its willingness to moderate its attitude towards Israel, San'a was not ready to take any step which might trigger Arab criticism against it. Even reports regarding the relaxation of the Arab Boycott against Israel by Oman and other Gulf countries did not inspire the Yemeni government to follow suit. In a statement to Al Ahram, Basindwah said that his country was not ready to end the boycott of Israel before a just and comprehensive peace in the Middle East became reality.

The Yemeni government seemed determined to maintain friendly relations with Egypt, even though the latter concluded a peace agreement with Israel. During his visit to Cairo in August 1993, Basindwah said: "The relations between Yemen and Egypt are deep rooted. These relations were baptized by blood when the Egyptian people and Army helped Yemen during our revolution against the defunct imams' rule and British colonialism". In an interview with an Egyptian newspaper, Saleh expressed his country's unqualified support for Egypt.

In March 1994, Sheikh Abd-al-Majid al-Zindani, member of the Yemeni Presidential Council warned against what he regarded as a foreign and Zionist scheme to partition Yemen into several stateless in order to make it easier to control its oil wealth and strategic location, especially in the strait of Bab el Mandab. In 1995, Yemen and Eritrea had a conflict over the strategic Hanish islands in the Red Sea. The Yemenis were convinced that Israel was involved in the conflict. Yemen's Deputy Prime Minister and Foreign Minister Abd-al-Karim al-Iryani said in a news conference:

Yemeni officials suggested that Israel supplied ammunition and equipment to the Eritrean forces in return for military bases on the Red Sea islands. Israel's Health Minister Efrayim Sne responded by saying that although Israel maintained good relations with Eritrea, it did not take part in the conflict. The fears that Israel was determined to prevent Yemen from controlling Bab alMandab increased partially as a result of an intense Iranian propaganda campaign aimed at keeping the two countries hostile to each other. Commenting on the Yemeni–Eritrean dispute over the three Red Sea islands, and the Eritrean occupation of Greater Hanish, an Iranian source said: 

While waging a verbal campaign against Israel, Yemen continued to collaborate closely with Iran and Iraq. It denounced U.S. policy toward Iraq and assisted Saddam Hussein on every occasion. According to the London-based newspaper Asharq Al-Awsat, 19 Iraqi pilots were being trained in Yemen in the fall of 1993. According to Iran's Minister of the Interior, Ali Mohammad Besharati, the promotion of his country's relations with Yemen was a pivotal feature of Iranian diplomacy. When the warring political forces in Yemen decided to reach an agreement in January 1994, the Yemeni government decided to hold a ceremony with Jordan's King Hussein as the mediator. Arafat was among the dignitaries invited. In an interview to Al-Ahram, Saleh said that he conferred with Egyptian President's Hosni Mubarak, and told him that it was beyond his comprehension how the Arabs continuously engaged in negotiations with Israel while they remained at odds with each other. When the U.S. announced its decision to move its embassy from Tel Aviv to Jerusalem, the Yemeni Cabinet denounced the decision and expressed hope that the US government will reverse the bill that Yemen regarded as "contradictory to all resolutions of international legitimacy". Yet despite the official Yemeni statements Israel, low profile contacts between the two countries continued to take place.

Yemen sent a representative to attend former Prime Minister Yitzhak Rabin's funeral, and although they were critical of the slow pace of the peace process, Yemeni officials were encouraged by the Israeli–Palestinian dialogue.

In February 1996, Abd-al-Wahhab Darawsha and Talab al-Sani, both leaders of the Democratic Party and Knesset members arrived in San'a at the invitation of the Yemeni parliament, the House of Representatives. The Yemeni government did not give publicity to their visit. Yemeni sources were careful to state that the visitors were being hosted in their capacity as Arab citizens, and not as Knesset representatives. Coaxed by President Bill Clinton and President Mubarak, the Yemeni government agreed to participate in the peacemaking summit that took place in Sharm el-Sheikh, Egypt on March 13, 1996.

In the spring of 1996, Yemeni Deputy Prime Minister and Foreign Minister, Abd al-Karim al-Iryani said that his government was deeply suspicious of what he called "the Zionist entity's intentions and seriousness in the search for peace". Yemen's Prime Minister, Faraj Said Bin Ghanem discussed issues of national security with his Egyptian counterpart, Kamal Ganzouri and Assistant Yemeni Foreign Minister, Eid Ali Abdel Rahman told news reporters that San'a would not take any steps towards establishing diplomatic relations with Israel until the latter agreed to the establishment of a Palestinian state with East Jerusalem as its capital.

The unwillingness of the Yemeni government to warm up to Israel was largely due to pressure exerted by the opposition groups. The most vocal opponent of the government's attempts to reconcile with Israel was the Yemeni Reform Grouping. Yemen's Deputy Prime Minister, Abd-al-Wahhab al-Anisi, who headed the group that was a partner of the General People's Congress in the coalition government, stated that he had reservations regarding Yemen's participation in the economic summit meeting held in Amman at the end of 1995. He also stated that his party boycotted the visit of an Israeli Knesset delegation to Yemen. His party's position, he said, was that peace in the Middle East could not be established without securing the Palestinians right to an independent state. The YSP was no less critical of the government's policy. It repeatedly called upon the government to refrain from participating in any event which Israel was represented. In August 1997, it urged the government to boycott the Middle East and North Africa economic summit scheduled for November that year in Qatar, if Israel did not take serious measures toward a lasting peace. Parliamentary speaker Abdullah al-Ahmar said that those countries who decided to attend the summit would be serving Israel's interests. Yemen's opposition parties became more vocal during the summer of 1997, when Israel's right-wing Likud government did not show willingness to accelerate the peace process.

In April 1999, there was a report that Abd al-Karim al-Iryani, by then Prime Minister of Yemen, had met with the director general of the Israeli Foreign Ministry. Reportedly, the meeting once again focused on visits, refugees and Israeli investments. But this was denied strongly by Sana'a. In June 1999, a Yemeni government official denied a report by the Israeli daily Maariv that Yemen was intending to normalize its relations with Israel. The Maariv report was described as "fabricated and baseless in spirit and content".

In January 2000, the Jordanian Al Majd newspaper said, quoting well-informed diplomatic sources in Amman that the Israeli embassy in the Jordanian had tried repeatedly to contact the Yemeni ambassador in Amman, Hassan Al Louzi, by telephone. In the same month, in a statement to the Kuwaiti daily Al-Seyassah, the then Yemeni foreign minister Abdul Qadir Bajamal said that all attempts made by Israel to use time to serve its interests in making a peace deal are doomed to failure. In March the Israeli airline, El Al, asked permission to use Yemeni airspace for its flights to the Far East but this was refused.

2006 Israel–Lebanon war

The ruling party, General People's Congress strongly condemned the actions of what it considered to be aggressions against the Palestinians and the Lebanese and called for the international community to intervene. Other political parties have also condemned the Israelis, and announced their support for the Palestinian and Lebanese people "in their fight for their right of survival and defeating occupier." They also called for the closing of Israeli embassies in Arab countries. Thousands came together in the capital city, Sana'a, on 19 July to protest the Israeli attacks against the Palestinians and Lebanese. The demonstration was organized by the ruling and opposition political parties.

Gaza War
Yemeni President Ali Abdullah Saleh condemned the Israeli raids as a “barbaric aggression”. Tens of thousands of people marched, many carrying banners condemning Israel and what they called "Arab silence" over the "extermination of the Palestinian people by the Zionist enemy". Following the war Yemen has prepared 42 tons of aid for the people of Gaza. Yemen has also declared its readiness to receive 500 injured Palestinians from the Gaza Strip and treat them in Yemeni hospitals.

Gaza flotilla raid
The Yemeni Parliament strongly condemned the Israeli attack and demanded for "an Islamic army to encounter the Israeli arrogance."

Accusations of espionage
In October 2008, security forces arrested six alleged Islamist militants linked to Israeli intelligence. In March 2009, a state security court sentenced 27-year-old Abdullah al-Haidari to death after convicting him of establishing contacts with the office of former Israeli Prime Minister Ehud Olmert. A three-year prison term for another convict in the case, Emad Ali al-Raimi, 24, was also confirmed by the appeals court. The court also lowered the sentence for a third convict Ali Abdullah al-Mahfal, 25, from five to three years. The three remaining suspects were released before trial, due to lack of evidence.

Operation Pillar of Cloud
According to a statement released to the Saba News Agency from a government source, "Yemen has announced its strong condemnation and denunciation of the "brutal Zionist aggression on the Gaza Strip, and standing of the Yemeni people with their brothers in Palestine at all times". The unnamed spoken also said that "The Yemeni government calls for the international community to bare their responsibilities towards the Zionist offensive and take swift action to stop this brutal aggression". The Yemeni parliament has denounced the Israeli operation, considering it an "aggression against all Arab and Muslim countries" and calling for using oil as a weapon to end the Israeli operation. It called on the Arab parliaments and shoura councils to hold an urgent meeting to discuss the "Israeli aggression against Gaza", calling for visiting Gaza in sympathy with its people. On 17 November, Permanent Representative of Yemen to the Arab League, Mohammed al-Haisami called "all Arab states to put an end to the cruel Zionist aggression on the Gaza Strip and to stop the crimes committed by Israel on the Palestinian people".

On November 19, hundreds marched in Sana'a to "affirm their solidarity with those under siege in the Gaza strip". The demonstrators, which began at Change Square, marched to the local Hamas office in Haseba district.

Since 2015 
Since the 2015 Civil War, both the Yemeni government and Houthis have refused normalization with Israel. The general public in Israel are increasingly growing concerned in regards to Houthi capability to potentially attack Israel. During a 2019 conference on fighting Iranian terrorism, a tense situation arose when the President of Yemen Abdrabbuh Mansur Hadi had to sit next to the Prime Minister of Israel Benjamin Netanyahu even though the two are enemies. With backing from the UAE, groups in the south of Yemen are warming up to the idea of normalized relations.

Cultural ties
When the Israeli singer, Ofra Haza planned to visit Yemen, where her parents emigrated from, the Yemeni government gave its approval. The organ of the Nasserist Unionist People's Organisation, Al-Warawi, was critical of this decision:  "The visit proves that the ruling coalition began to march toward normalization of cultural and economic relations with Israel." It added that the approval given to the singer's visit was "a flying balloon whose purpose is to gauge the response of the nation and the parties before additional steps to normalize relations can be taken." The organ of the Arab Socialist Ba'ath Party, Al-Thawri, claimed that the attempt to improve relations with Israel was part of a Yemeni grand design to become friendly with the United States.

In 2010, Yemen sacked the country's chess team and members of the governing body after its players competed against Israel at a tournament in Belarus. The Yemeni Sports minister, Hamud Mohammed Ubad, ordered the dismissal after players ignored instructions to pull out if drawn against Israel. Ubad said that "this was an individual action contrary to the policy of Yemen, which refuses any normalisation with Israel".

Politics 
Following the Houthi insurgency in Yemen, tensions grew with Israel. Analyst Salem Al Ketbi argued that a Houthi attack on Israel, albeit unlikely, is still a possibility, but could take the form of an intelligence or cyberspace attack rather than a military one.

See also

 Foreign relations of Israel
 Foreign relations of Yemen
 International recognition of Israel
 Arab–Israeli conflict

References

 
Yemen
Bilateral relations of Yemen